Chet Kozel (October 15, 1919 – June 27, 1982) was a player in the All-America Football Conference for the Buffalo Bills and Chicago Rockets in 1947 and 1948 as a tackle and guard. He played at the collegiate level at the University of Mississippi.

Biography
Kozel was born Chester Richard Kozel on October 15, 1919, in Kenosha, Wisconsin. He died on June 27, 1982, in Kenosha.

References

Players of American football from Wisconsin
Sportspeople from Kenosha, Wisconsin
American football offensive linemen
Ole Miss Rebels football players
Chicago Rockets players
Buffalo Bills (AAFC) players
1919 births
1982 deaths